Oscar Sigurd Lindelöf (15 September 1903 – 4 January 1993) was a Swedish wrestler who competed in the Greco-Roman wrestling bantamweight class at the 1928 Summer Olympics and the Greco-Roman featherweight class at the 1932 Summer Olympics.

References

1903 births
1993 deaths
Olympic wrestlers of Sweden
Wrestlers at the 1928 Summer Olympics
Wrestlers at the 1932 Summer Olympics
Swedish male sport wrestlers
People from Landskrona Municipality
Sportspeople from Skåne County
20th-century Swedish people